Gosforth Junior may refer to:

 Gosforth Junior Drama League
 Gosforth Junior High School, a middle school in Gosforth, Newcastle upon Tyne, England